St. Patrick's Church, Duleek is a medieval church and National Monument in County Meath, Ireland. It is believed to have been the first stone church built in Ireland.

Location

History

According to tradition, St Patrick established a bishopric here c. AD 450 and placed it in the care of Saint Cianán in 489. It acquires its name from the Irish damhliag, "stone house," as it is believed to have been the first stone church in Ireland. It is mentioned in the Annals of Ulster for AD 724. Other churches were known as dairthech, "oak house," as they were made of oak wood. Duleek was sacked by Vikings in 830. In 1014 the bodies of Brian Boru and his son Murchad mac Briain lay in state at Duleek. The Vikings plundered it again in 1149 and the Normans in 1171.

Church
St. Patrick's Church, Duleek is a simple rectangular structure. The northeast wall is partially missing and the southwest wall is completely absent. There is a pointed doorway of undressed stone in the southeast wall. A limestone slab in the wall reads ÓR DO SCANLA_N ("pray for Scanlain").

References

Churches in County Meath
Archaeological sites in County Meath
National Monuments in County Meath
Former churches in the Republic of Ireland